Joseph Theodore Cummings (born 8 September 1998) is an English professional footballer who plays as a defender for Boston United.

Career
Cummings came through the Academy at Sheffield United to make his senior debut for the "Blades" after coming on for Chris Basham 76 minutes into a 4–2 victory over Grimsby Town in an EFL Trophy match on 9 November 2016.

Cummings joined Charlton Athletic in May 2017. On 17 October 2018, Cummings joined National League North side Guiseley on a one-month loan deal.

Cummings joined Scunthorpe United on 8 July 2019, after being released by Charlton Athletic. On 6 March 2020, Cummings joined Radcliffe on loan until the end of the 2019/20 season.

On 20 June 2020, Cummings joined Radcliffe on a permanent basis after being released by Scunthorpe United.

On 24 June 2022, Cummings joined National League North side Spennymoor Town.

On 19 November 2022, Cummings signed for fellow National League North side Boston United.

Statistics

References

External links

1998 births
Living people
Footballers from Sheffield
English footballers
Association football defenders
Sheffield United F.C. players
Charlton Athletic F.C. players
Guiseley A.F.C. players
Scunthorpe United F.C. players
Radcliffe F.C. players
Sheffield F.C. players
Spennymoor Town F.C. players
Boston United F.C. players
National League (English football) players
Northern Premier League players